Jowsheqan va Kamu (meaning "Jowsheqan and Kamu") is a city in Qamsar District, Kashan County, Isfahan Province, Iran.  At the 2006 census, its population was 5,477, in 1,730 families.

The city is an amalgam of two earlier settlements, Jowsheqan (also Romanized as Jowsheqān; also known as Jowsheqān-e Qālī, Jowshaqān-e-Qālī, and Jūshqān Qāli) and Kamu (Persian: کامو, also Romanized as Kāmū and Qamu).

The district is primarily agricultural. The water is supplied by local springs, the river Kan, and subterranean channels (kāriz). Major products are those of the cool (sardsir) climate. The farmers cultivate rose for extraction of rosewater (golāb), which is now a growing business in the region. Jowshaqān has marble quarries, the exploitation of which has been the major industrial activity in the district

References

Populated places in Kashan County

Cities in Isfahan Province